Yerino is a rural locality (a village) in Bogorodskoye Rural Settlement, Ust-Kubinsky District, Vologda Oblast, Russia. The population was 20 as of 2002.

Geography 
The distance to Ustye is 52 km, to Bogorodskoye is 2 km. Sokolovo is the nearest rural locality.

References 

Rural localities in Tarnogsky District